Malik Müller (born January 24, 1994) is a German professional basketball player for Hamburg Towers of the German Basketball Bundesliga.

Professional career
In the 2015 offseason, Müller signed a three-year deal with Brose Bamberg. On December 11, 2017, he parted ways with Bamberg. The next day he signed with BG Göttingen for the rest of the season.

International career
Born in Frankfurt, Germany, Müller was a part of the German U-17, U-18 and U-20 national team.

References

1994 births
Living people
Baunach Young Pikes players
BG Göttingen players
Brose Bamberg players
German expatriate basketball people in the United States
German men's basketball players
Hamburg Towers players
Riesen Ludwigsburg players
Shooting guards
Sportspeople from Frankfurt
Virginia Tech Hokies men's basketball players